Chinna Vathiyar is a 1995 Indian Tamil-language science fiction comedy film, directed by Singeetam Srinivasa Rao. The film stars Prabhu in a dual role, Khushbu, Ranjitha, Goundamani, Senthil and Nizhalgal Ravi. Music was by Ilaiyaraaja and lyrics were by Vaali. The comedy subplot was inspired by Crazy Mohan's play Madhu +2. The film was successful at the box office.

Plot 

The story revolves around a professor named Chandramouli, who experiments on transferring the soul from one body to another. Professor Chandramouli is married to Janaki. He got help from a student Aravind, who is a bright student and a star in the school. The story begins when the two souls of professor and Aravind are transferred and it makes it uncomfortable to both parties and their girls. Meanwhile, a wealthy girl-abuser Baba took professor's favourite student and sold her to a gang. However, soul-changed professor and Aravind came to rescue her, where Baba flees from the police. Baba learns of the miracle medicine produced by the professor to change souls and when the soul changed professor and Aravind came to correct their souls at a cemetery. Professor gets changed, but Aravind's soul went on to a cat. Baba came quickly and hit professor and Baba changed his soul to Aravind's body. The cat with Aravind's soul is put into a nearby well and he flees with the miracle medicine. The new Aravind behaves differently and misbehaves. Finally, the professor realises the change. He finally found the miracle medicine which was hidden in the worshipped anthill. At last after a series of events, Aravind's soul is released from the cat and Baba's soul is trapped within a chicken.

Cast 

 Prabhu as Professor Chandramouli / Aravind
 Khushbu as Janaki
 Ranjitha as Mythili
 Nizhalgal Ravi as Baba
 Goundamani as Josiyar
 Senthil as Josiyar's friend
 Kovai Sarala as Vimala
 Delhi Ganesh as Aravind's father
 Bhagyalakshmi as Bhagyasri
 Chinni Jayanth as Chinni
 C. R. Parthiban as Sr. Doctor
 Crazy Mohan as Doctor
 R. S. Shivaji
 S. N. Lakshmi
 Dharani as Josiyar's wife
 Idichapuli Selvaraj as K. Sethuraman
 Pasi Sathya

Production 
The film was initially titled Professor, and the team subsequently chose to change title hoping to appeal to the Tamil speaking audience. The comedy subplot was inspired by Crazy Mohan's play Madhu +2.

Soundtrack 
The soundtrack was composed by Ilaiyaraaja, with lyrics written by Vaali.

Legacy 
Chinna Vathiyar attained cult status in Tamil cinema for the Senthil-Goundamani comedy track.

References

External links 
 

1990s science fiction comedy films
1990s Tamil-language films
1995 comedy films
1995 films
Body swapping in films
Films directed by Singeetam Srinivasa Rao
Films scored by Ilaiyaraaja
Films with screenplays by Crazy Mohan
Indian films based on plays
Indian science fiction comedy films